Bigg Boss 3 was the third season of the reality TV game show Bigg Boss, which commenced on 23 June 2019 with 17 contestants (15 first-day entrants, 2 wildcard entrants, and 1 re–entrant). Kamal Haasan returned as host for the show third time. The show was aired on Star Vijay. Hotstar also provided content aired on television.

The house, located at EVP World in Chembarambakkam, Chennai, was completely renovated with a Chettinad-based theme for this season. It is the only season in Bigg Boss history where a foreigner has won the show.  Mugen Rao, a musical artist from Malaysia won the title and Sandy emerged as the first runner-up.

Abhirami Venkatachalam and Vanitha Vijayakumar returned as contestants in Bigg Boss Ultimate (season 1).

Housemate status
Following were the housemates who took part in Bigg Boss Tamil Season 3:

Housemates

Original Contestants

 Fathima Babu – film actor and newsreader
 Mohan Vaidya – musician
 Losliya Mariyanesan– Sri Lankan Tamil newsreader, film actor
 Sakshi Agarwal – film actress
 Abhirami Venkatachalam – actor, model
 Jangiri Madhumitha – comedienne
 Saravanan – film actor
 Sherin Shringar – film actress
 Cheran – film director
 Kavin – serial and film actor
 Vanitha Vijayakumar – film actress
 Tharshan Thiyagaraja – Sri Lankan Tamil model and actor 
 Mugen Rao– Musician, singer and actor
 Sandy  — choreographer
 Reshma Pasupuleti – serial and film actor

Wildcard Contestants

1.Meera Mithun -  Model

2.Kasthuri Shankar – Film actress

Re-entry Contestants
 Vanitha Vijayakumar – actress

Guests appearance

Nominations table

Notes
 indicates that the Housemate was directly nominated for eviction.
 indicates the House Captain.
 indicates the former House Captain. (former meaning that the House Captain would have been stripped of the captaincy, or else evicted/ejected/walked out after being nominated as the Captain)
 indicates that the housemate was saved from nominations (Immune), or entered the Bigg Boss House after the weekly nomination (Exempt).
 indicates that an evicted contestant was sent to Secret room and re-entered the Bigg Boss House after few days.
 indicates that contestant was walked out of BiggBoss house on his own.
 indicates that the housemate has re entered.
  indicates the contestant has been ejected.
 indicates the winner.
  indicates the first runner up.
  indicates the second runner up.
  indicates the third runner up.
  indicates the contestant has been evicted.
  indicates the contestant is nominated.
BOLD, If a housemates name is in bold during "against public vote" it means that they are a finalist.

References

External links
 
 Bigg Boss Tamil 3 at Hotstar

Tamil 3
2019 Indian television seasons
2019 Tamil-language television seasons
Kamal Haasan
Star Vijay original programming
Tamil-language television shows